The Belarusian First League is the second tier of professional football in Belarus. It was created in 1992, following the Belarusian independence.

History and format
The typical format of the league involves 16 clubs playing a double round-robin tournament over 30 matchdays (with the exception of shortened 1992 and 1995 seasons, which were a single round-robin tournaments). On several occasions the number of participating teams was smaller (15 or 14), due to last minute withdrawals and no teams available for replacement. In most of the seasons, two best teams are getting promoted to Belarusian Premier League, while two worst teams are relegated Belarusian Second League.

First League in 2019
In 2019, the Belarusian First League will consist of the following 15 teams:

Winners and promoted teams
Teams in bold were promoted to Premier League at the end of the season.

1 Team lost promotion/relegation play-off
2 Team was eligible for promotion but was denied Premier League license
3 Team won promotion/relegation play-off but disbanded after the season
4 Smorgon promoted from the 6th place

External links
Official website

 
2
Second level football leagues in Europe
Professional sports leagues in Belarus